Ivan Vasilievich Changes Profession is a Soviet comic science fiction film directed by Leonid Gaidai in June 1973. In the United States the film has sometimes been sold under the title Ivan Vasilievich: Back to the Future. This film is based on the play Ivan Vasilievich by Mikhail Bulgakov. It was one of the most attended films in the Soviet Union in 1973, with more than 60 million tickets sold.

Plot 

The story begins in 1973 Moscow, where engineer Aleksandr "Shurik" Timofeyev (Aleksandr Demyanenko) is working on a time machine in his apartment. By accident, he sends Ivan Vasilievich Bunsha (Yury Yakovlev), superintendent of his apartment building, and George Miloslavsky (Leonid Kuravlyov), a burglar, back into the time of Ivan IV "The Terrible". The pair is forced to disguise themselves, with Bunsha dressing up as Ivan IV (tsar) and Miloslavsky as a knyaz (duke) of the same name. At the same time, the real Ivan IV (also played by Yury Yakovlev) is sent by the same machine into Shurik's apartment, he has to deal with modern-day life while Shurik tries to fix the machine so that everyone can be brought back to their proper place in time. Superintendent Bunsha and Tsar Ivan IV the Terrible are lookalikes but have completely different personalities, which results in funny situations of mistaken identity. As the police (tipped off by a neighbor who was burgled by Miloslavsky) close in on Shurik, who is frantically trying to repair the machine, the cover of Bunsha and Miloslavsky is blown and they have to fight off the Streltsy, who have figured out that Bunsha is an impostor. The movie ends with Bunsha, Miloslavsky, and Ivan IV all transported back to their proper places, although the entire episode is revealed to be a dream by Shurik... or was it?

Cast 
 Yury Yakovlev (Ivan the Terrible/Ivan Vasilievich Bunsha, building superintendent)
 Leonid Kuravlyov (George Miloslavsky, burglar)
 Aleksandr Demyanenko (Aleksandr 'Shurik' Timofeyev, inventor)
 Savely Kramarov (Feofan the diak)
 Natalya Seleznyova (Zinaida, Shurik's wife)
 Natalya Krachkovskaya (Uliana Andreevna Bunsha, superintendent's wife)
 Natalya Kustinskaya (Yakin's mistress)
 Vladimir Etush (Anton Semyonovich Shpak, dentist)
 Mikhail Pugovkin (film director Yakin)
 Sergey Filippov (Swedish ambassador)
 Edward Bredun (black market seller)
 Natalia Gurzo (Shpak's dental nurse)
 Nina Maslova (Tsaritza Marfa)
 Viktor Uralsky (Police sergeant-major)
 Ivan Zhevago (Psychiatrist)

Production

Film locations

Moscow, USSR. The modern Moscow location is New Arbat Avenue, formerly Kalinin Prospekt - then, and perhaps still now, a fairly prestigious location of Moscow, which is not too far from the Kremlin.
Rostov Kremlin, Rostov, USSR
Yalta, USSR

Props
The time machine for the film was created by the artist, wood sculptor and cartoonist Vyacheslav Pochechuev. The original version of the time machine, manufactured by a special bureau, turned out to be an expressionless layout of a standard computer. Pochechuev sketched a new model and, with the help of a designer, a locksmith and a glassblower, created a new time machine in a few days, causing the audience to feel a miracle . Pochechuev received a prize of 40 rubles, and in the certificate from the accounting department it was written: "The money was issued for the invention of a time machine."

Soundtrack
Nina Brodskaya performed the song "Zvenit yanvarskaya vyuga" for the film. It was also recorded by Sofia Rotaru. In 2014, Italian pop punk band Vanilla Sky recorded a cover of this song along with music video.

Lev Polosin & Boris Kuznetsov and the Moscow Military District Choir performed the song "Cap-cap-cap" ("Marusya"). Valery Zolotukhin performed the song «Razgovor so schast'em».

Deviations from the original play
The original play was written by Bulgakov in 1935 (albeit not published until 1965) and, therefore, used a setting typical to the 1930s. The film, released in 1973, made changes to the setting to make it contemporary. For instance, Shpak's phonograph was replaced in the film with a tape recorder, and the time machine was envisioned as using more advanced technology such as transistors. In addition, inventor Timofeyev is inspired to travel to Ivan IV's era after Miloslavsky recitaring the book about Ivan IV, as opposed to listening to the opera The Maid of Pskov on the radio.

There were other deviations, not related to changes designed to modernize the setting. While the inventor's surname Timofeyev was retained, he was called Nikolai (nicknamed "Koka" by his wife Zinaida), while in the film, his name is Alexander (called "Shurik" informally). He is presumably an older version of the protagonist of two previous Leonid Gaidai films: Operation Y and Other Shurik's Adventures and Kidnapping, Caucasian Style, played by the same actor, Aleksandr Demyanenko; this connection, though, is not stated outright and neither of these earlier films are referenced.

In addition, the reason for the time machine malfunction was changed. In the original play, Bunsha and Miloslavsky knowingly disable the machine to seal the gateway between the two time periods, but are dragged into the past, along with the key to the machine, forcing Timofeyev to make a replacement key. In the film, the time machine is accidentally damaged by a halberd, and Timofeyev has to search for some transistors to repair it.

Finally, while the "all just a dream" ending is present in both the play and the film, the play ends on a revelation that Shpak's apartment has been robbed in reality, not only in the dream. This twist is absent in the film.

In the play, Ivan Vasilievich Bunsha is the son of a nobleman, something which, as a conscientious Soviet bureaucrat, he tries to hide. This isn't mentioned in the film, and would have been an anachronism in 1973.

Bunsha's full surname in the play is Bunsha-Koretsky.

In mass media
In November 2020, Sberbank released an advertisement in which George Miloslavsky went to Moscow on a time machine in the sample of 2020. The image of Miloslavsky was recreated using Deepfake technology.

References

External links

 
 Trailer and Screenshots
 Screenshots and the script of the film compared with the original play by Bulgakov (in Russian)

1973 comedy films
1973 films
1970s historical comedy films
1970s science fiction comedy films
Cultural depictions of Ivan the Terrible
Films about lookalikes
Films about time travel
Films based on works by Mikhail Bulgakov
Films directed by Leonid Gaidai
Films partially in color
Films scored by Aleksandr Zatsepin
Films set in 1973
Films set in the 16th century
Films set in Moscow
Films set in the Soviet Union
Films shot in Crimea
Films shot in Moscow
Films shot in Yaroslavl Oblast
Mosfilm films
1970s Russian-language films
Russian science fiction comedy films
Soviet historical comedy films
Soviet science fiction comedy films